Gaza mon amour is a drama film, directed by Tarzan Nasser and Arab Nasser and released in 2020. It is a coproduction of companies from Palestine, France, Germany, Portugal, California and Qatar.

The film premiered at the 2020 Venice Film Festival. It was subsequently screened at the 2020 Toronto International Film Festival, where it was named the winner of the NETPAC Award for best Asian film at the festival. It was selected as the Palestinian entry for the Best International Feature Film at the 93rd Academy Awards, but it was not nominated.

Synopsis
Issa, a 60-year-old fisherman in Gaza has never had the courage to tell Siham he's in love with her. When he finds a phallic sculpture of the Greek god Apollo in his fishing net, he believes his luck may have turned around.

See also
 List of submissions to the 93rd Academy Awards for Best International Feature Film
 List of Palestinian submissions for the Academy Award for Best International Feature Film

References

External links

2020 films
2020 drama films
Palestinian drama films
French drama films
German drama films
Portuguese drama films
Qatari drama films
2020s Arabic-language films
2020s French films
Films set in the Gaza Strip